The Olympiastadion is a sport stadium located in Berlin, Germany. Originally built for the 1936 Summer Olympics, the stadium  has been used for concerts and festivals since the early 1990s.

Concerts

Festivals

References

Olympiastadion Berlin